This is a list of Grevillea species accepted by Plants of the World Online as of December 2021:

A

Grevillea acacioides C.A.Gardner ex McGill. (W.A.)
Grevillea acanthifolia A.Cunn. – Acanthus-leaved grevillea (N.S.W.)
Grevillea acanthifolia A.Cunn. subsp. acanthifolia
Grevillea acanthifolia subsp. paludosa Makinson & Albr.  — bog grevillea
Grevillea acanthifolia subsp. stenomera (F.Muell. ex Benth.) McGill.
Grevillea acerata McGill. (N.S.W.)
Grevillea acrobotrya Meisn. (W.A.)
Grevillea acropogon Makinson (W.A.)
Grevillea acuaria F.Muell. ex Benth. (W.A.)
Grevillea adenotricha McGill. (W.A.)
Grevillea agrifolia A.Cunn. ex R.Br. — blue grevillea (W.A., N.T.)
Grevillea agrifolia A.Cunn. ex R.Br. subsp. agrifolia 
Grevillea agrifolia subsp. microcarpa (Olde & Marriott) Makinson
Grevillea albiflora C.T.White – white spider flower (N.S.W., Qld., S.A., N.T.)
Grevillea alpina Lindl. – cat's claw grevillea (N.S.W., A.C.T., Vic.)
Grevillea alpivaga Gand. — Buffalo grevillea (Vic.)
Grevillea althoferorum Olde & Marriott (W.A.)
Grevillea althoferorum Olde & Marriott subsp. althoferorum
Grevillea althoferorum subsp. fragilis Olde & Marriott
Grevillea amplexans F.Muell. ex Benth. (W.A.)
Grevillea amplexans subsp. adpressa (Olde & Marriott) Makinson 
Grevillea amplexans F.Muell. ex Benth. subsp. amplexans
Grevillea amplexans subsp. semivestita Makinson 
Grevillea anethifolia R.Br. (W.A.)
Grevillea aneura McGill. (W.A.)
Grevillea angulata R.Br. (N.T.)
Grevillea angustiloba (F.Muell.) Downing (S.A., Vic.)
Grevillea angustiloba (F.Muell.) Downing subsp. angustiloba
Grevillea angustiloba subsp. wirregaensis Downing 
Grevillea annulifera F.Muell. — prickly plume grevillea (W.A.)
Grevillea aquifolium Lindl. — holly grevillea (Vic., S.A.)
Grevillea arenaria R.Br.
Grevillea arenaria R.Br. subsp. arenaria – sand grevillea (N.S.W.)
Grevillea arenaria subsp. canescens (R.Br.) Olde & Marriott – hoary grevillea (N.S.W.)
Grevillea argyrophylla Meisn. — silvery-leaved grevillea (W.A.)
Grevillea armigera Meisn. prickly toothbrushes (W.A.)
Grevillea asparagoides Meisn. (W.A.)
Grevillea aspera R.Br. – rough grevillea (S.A., W.A.)
Grevillea aspleniifolia Knight (N.S.W.)
Grevillea asteriscosa Diels — star-leaf grevillea (W.A.)
Grevillea aurea Olde & Marriott (N.T.)
Grevillea australis R.Br. — alpine grevillea (N.S.W., A.C.T., Vic., Tas.)

B

Grevillea banksii R.Br. — Banks' grevillea, Byfield waratah, red flowered silky, kāhili flower (Qld.)
Grevillea banyabba Olde & Marriott – Banyabba grevilles (N.S.W.)
Grevillea barklyana F.Muell. ex Benth. — gully grevillea (Vic.)
Grevillea batrachioides F.Muell. ex McGill. – Mount Lesueur grevillea (W.A.)
Grevillea baueri R.Br. – Bauer's grevillea (N.S.W.)
Grevillea baueri subsp. asperula McGill.
Grevillea baueri  R.Br. subsp. baueri
Grevillea baxteri  R.Br. — Cape Arid grevillea (W.A.)
Grevillea beadleana  McGill. – Beadle's grevillea (N.S.W.)
Grevillea beardiana  McGill. – red combs (W.A.)
Grevillea bedggoodiana J.H.Willis ex McGill. — Enfield grevillea (Vic.)
Grevillea bemboka Stajsic & Molyneux (N.S.W.)
Grevillea benthamiana McGill. (N.T.)
Grevillea berryana Ewart & Jean White (W.A.)
Grevillea biformis Meisn. (W.A.)
Grevillea biformis Meisn. subsp. biformis
Grevillea biformis subsp. cymbiformis Olde & Marriott
Grevillea bipinnatifida R.Br. — fuchsia grevillea (W.A.)
Grevillea bipinnatifida  R.Br. subsp. bipinnatifida    
Grevillea bipinnatifida subsp. pagna Cranfield
Grevillea biternata Meisn. (W.A.)
Grevillea brachystachya Meisn. (W.A.)
Grevillea brachystylis Meisn. (W.A.)
Grevillea brachystylis subsp. australis Keighery
Grevillea brachystylis Meisn. subsp. brachystylis
Grevillea brachystylis subsp. grandis Keighery 
Grevillea bracteosa Meisn. (W.A.)
Grevillea bracteosa Meisn. subsp. bracteosa
Grevillea bracteosa subsp. howatharra Olde & Marriott
Grevillea brevifolia F.Muell. ex Benth. — Cobberas grevillea (Vic., N.S.W.)
Grevillea brevis Olde & Marriott (N.T.)
Grevillea bronweniae Keighery (W.A.)
Grevillea burrowa Molyneux & Forrester — Burrowa grevillea (Vic.)
Grevillea buxifolia (Sm.) R.Br. — grey spider flower (N.S.W.)
Grevillea buxifolia (Sm.) R.Br. subsp. buxifolia   
Grevillea buxifolia subsp. ecorniculata Olde & Marriott 
Grevillea byrnesii McGill. (W.A., N.T.)

C

 
Grevillea cagiana McGill. – red toothbrushes (W.A.)
Grevillea calcicola A.S.George (W.A.)
Grevillea caleyi R.Br. — Caley's grevillea (N.S.W.)
Grevillea calliantha Makinson & Olde — Foote's grevillea, black magic grevillea, Cataby grevillea (W.A.)
Grevillea callichlaena Molyneux & Stajsic — Mt. Benambra grevillea (Vic.)
Grevillea candelabroides C.A.Gardner (W.A.)
Grevillea candicans C.A.Gardner (W.A.)
Grevillea candolleana Meisn. — Toodyay grevillea (W.A.)
Grevillea capitellata Meisn. (N.S.W.)
Grevillea celata Molyneux — Nowa Nowa grevillea, Colquhoun grevillea (Vic.)
Grevillea centristigma (McGill.) Keighery (W.A.)
Grevillea ceratocarpa Diels (W.A.)
Grevillea cheilocarpa Makinson (W.A.)
Grevillea christineae McGill. – Christine's grevillea (W.A.)
Grevillea chrysophaea F.Muell. ex Meisn. — golden grevillea (Vic.)
Grevillea cirsiifolia Meisn. – varied-leaf grevillea (W.A.)
Grevillea coccinea Meisn. (W.A.)
Grevillea coccinea Meisn. subsp. coccinea
Grevillea coccinea subsp. lanata Olde & Marriott 
Grevillea commutata F.Muell. (W.A.)
Grevillea commutata subsp. pinnatisecta Makinson
Grevillea commutata F.Muell. subsp. commutata
Grevillea concinna R.Br. — red combs, elegant grevillea (W.A.)
Grevillea concinna R.Br. subsp. concinna
Grevillea concinna subsp. lemanniana (Meisn.) McGill.
Grevillea confertifolia F.Muell. — Grampians grevillea, dense-leaf grevillea (Vic.)
Grevillea corrugata Olde & Marriott (W.A.)
Grevillea costata A.S.George (W.A.)
Grevillea crassifolia Domin (W.A.)
Grevillea cravenii Makinson (W.A.)
Grevillea crithmifolia R.Br. (W.A.)
Grevillea crowleyae Olde & Marriott (W.A.)
Grevillea cunninghamii R.Br. (W.A.)
Grevillea curviloba McGill. (W.A.) (accepted by the Australian Plant Census)
Grevillea curviloba McGill. subsp. curviloba 
Grevillea curviloba subsp. incurva Olde & Marriott
Grevillea cyranostigma McGill. (Qld.)

D

Grevillea decipiens McGill. (W.A.)
Grevillea decora Domin (Qld.)
Grevillea decora Domin subsp. decora
Grevillea decora subsp. telfordii Makinson
Grevillea decurrens Ewart – clothes-peg tree (W.A., N.T.)
Grevillea deflexa F.Muell. (W.A.)
Grevillea delta (McGill.) Olde & Marriott (W.A.)
Grevillea depauperata R.Br. (W.A.)
Grevillea deplanchei Brongn. & Gris (New Caledonia)
Grevillea didymobotrya Meisn. (W.A.)
Grevillea didymobotrya Meisn. subsp. didymobotrya
Grevillea didymobotrya subsp. involutaMcGill.
Grevillea dielsiana C.A.Gardner (W.A.)   
Grevillea diffusa Sieber ex Spreng. (N.S.W.)
Grevillea diffusa Sieber ex Spreng. subsp. diffusa
Grevillea diffusa subsp. filipendula McGill.
Grevillea dilatata (R.Br.) Downing (S.A.)
Grevillea dimidiata F.Muell. (W.A.)
Grevillea diminuta L.A.S.Johnson (A.C.T., N.S.W.)
Grevillea dimorpha F.Muell. — flame grevillea, olive grevillea (Vic.)
Grevillea disjuncta F.Muell. (W.A.)
Grevillea divaricata R.Br. (N.S.W.)
Grevillea diversifolia Meisn. — variable-leaved grevillea (W.A.)
Grevillea diversifolia Meisn. subsp. diversifolia
Grevillea diversifolia subsp. subtersericata McGill. 
Grevillea dolichopoda (McGill.) Olde & Marriott (W.A.)
Grevillea donaldiana Kenneally (W.A.)
Grevillea drummondii Meisn. — Drummond's grevillea (W.A.)
Grevillea dryandri R.Br. (W.A., N.T., Qld.)
Grevillea dryandri subsp. dasycarpa McGill. (N.T.)
Grevillea dryandri R.Br. subsp. dryandri (W.A., N.T., Qld.)
Grevillea dryandroides C.A.Gardner — phalanx grevillea (W.A.)
Grevillea dryandroides C.A.Gardner subsp. dryandroides
Grevillea dryandroides subsp. hirsuta Olde & Marriott
Grevillea dryophylla N.A.Wakef. — Goldfields grevillea (Vic.)
Grevillea dunlopii Makinson (N.T.)

E

Grevillea edelfeltii F.Muell. – white oak (Qld., P.N.G.)
Grevillea elbertii Sleumer (Indonesia)
Grevillea elongata Olde & Marriott – ironstone grevillea (W.A.)
Grevillea endlicheriana Meisn. — spindly grevillea (W.A.)
Grevillea epicroca Stajsic & Molyneux (N.S.W.)
Grevillea erectiloba F.Muell. (W.A.)
Grevillea eremophila (Diels) Olde & Marriott (W.A.)
Grevillea erinacea Meisn. (W.A.)
Grevillea eriobotrya F.Muell. — woolly cluster grevillea (W.A.)
Grevillea eriostachya Lindl. — flame grevillea, orange grevillea, honey grevillea (W.A., S.A., N.T.)
Grevillea eryngioides Benth. – curly grevillea (W.A.)
Grevillea erythroclada W.Fitzg. — needle-leaf grevillea (W.A., N.T., Qld.)
Grevillea evanescens Olde & Marriott (W.A.)
Grevillea evansiana MacKee – Evans grevillea (N.S.W.)
Grevillea excelsior Diels — flame grevillea (W.A.)
Grevillea exposita Olde & Marriott (W.A.)
Grevillea extorris S.Moore (W.A.)
Grevillea exul Lindley (New Caledonia)

F

Grevillea fasciculata R.Br. (W.A.)
Grevillea fastigiata Olde & Marriott (W.A.)
Grevillea fililoba (McGill.) Olde & Marriott (W.A.)
Grevillea fistulosa A.S.George (W.A.)
Grevillea flexuosa (Lindl.) Meisn. — zigzag grevillea, tangled grevillea (W.A.)
Grevillea floribunda R.Br. — seven dwarfs grevillea (N.S.W., Qld.)
Grevillea floribunda R.Br. subsp. floribunda
Grevillea floribunda subsp. tenella Olde & Marriott 
Grevillea florida (McGill.) Makinson (W.A.)
Grevillea floripendula R.V.Sm. — Ben Major grevillea, drooping grevillea (Vic.)
Grevillea formosa McGill. – Mount Brockman grevillea (N.T.)
Grevillea fulgens C.A.Gardner (W.A.)
Grevillea fuscolutea Keighery (W.A.)

G

Grevillea gariwerdensis Makinson (Vic.)
Grevillea × gaudichaudii R.Br. ex Gaudich. (N.S.W.)
Grevillea georgeana McGill. (W.A.)
Grevillea gillivrayi Hook. & Arn. (New Caledonia)
Grevillea gillivrayi Hook. & Arn. var. gillivrayi  — dipadoo
Grevillea gillivrayi var. glabriflora Virot  
Grevillea glabrescens Olde & Marriott (N.T.)
Grevillea glauca Banks & Sol. ex Knight — bushman's clothes-peg (Qld., P.N.G.)
Grevillea globosa C.A.Gardner (W.A.)
Grevillea glossadenia McGill. (Qld.)
Grevillea goodii R.Br. (N.T.)
Grevillea gordoniana C.A.Gardner (W.A.)
Grevillea granulifera (McGill.) Olde & Marriott (N.S.W.)
Grevillea granulosa McGill. (W.A.)
Grevillea guthrieana Olde & Marriott (N.S.W.)

H

Grevillea hakeoides Meisn. (W.A.)
Grevillea hakeoides Meisn. subsp. hakeoides
Grevillea hakeoides subsp. stenophylla (W.Fitzg.) McGill.
Grevillea halmaturina Tate (S.A.)
Grevillea halmaturina Tate subsp. halmaturina
Grevillea halmaturina subsp. laevis Makinson  
Grevillea haplantha F.Muell. ex Benth. (W.A.)
Grevillea haplantha F.Muell. ex Benth. subsp. haplantha
Grevillea haplantha subsp. recedens Olde & Marriott
Grevillea heliosperma R.Br. — rock grevillea (W.A., N.T., Qld.)
Grevillea helmsiae F.M.Bailey (Qld.)
Grevillea hilliana F.Muell. — white yiel yiel, white silky oak, grey oak, silky oak, yiel yiel, yill gill, Hill's silky oak (N.S.W., Qld.)
Grevillea hirtella (Benth.) Olde & Marriott (W.A.)
Grevillea hislopii Olde & Marriott (W.A.)
Grevillea hockingsii Molyneux & Olde (Qld.)
Grevillea hodgei Olde & Marriott — Coochin Hills grevillea (Qld.)
Grevillea hookeriana Meisn. — red toothbrushes, Hooker's grevillea (W.A.)
Grevillea hookeriana subsp. apiciloba (F.Muell.) Makinson
Grevillea hookeriana Meisn. subsp. hookeriana
Grevillea hortiorum* Olde (W.A.)
Grevillea huegelii Meisn. — comb spider-flower, comb grevillea (W.A., S.A., Vic., N.S.W.)
Grevillea humifusa Olde & Marriott — spreading grevillea (W.A.)
Grevillea humilis Makinson (N.S.W., Qld.)
Grevillea humilis Makinson subsp. humilis
Grevillea humilis subsp. lucens Makinson
Grevillea humilis subsp. maritima Makinson
Grevillea hystrix* R.W.Davis — porcupine grevillea (W.A.)

I

Grevillea iaspicula McGill. — Wee Jasper grevillea (N.S.W.)
Grevillea ilicifolia (R.Br.) R.Br. — holly grevillea, holly bush (S.A., Vic., N.S.W.)
Grevillea ilicifolia (R.Br.) R.Br. subsp. ilicifolia
Grevillea ilicifolia subsp. lobata (F.Muell.) Downing 
Grevillea imberbis Makinson (N.S.W.)
Grevillea inconspicua Diels – Cue grevillea (W.A.)
Grevillea incrassata Diels (W.A.)
Grevillea incurva (Diels) Olde & Marriott (W.A.)
Grevillea infecunda McGill. — Anglesea grevillea (Vic.)
Grevillea infundibularis A.S.George — fan-leaf grevillea (W.A.)
Grevillea insignis Kippist ex Meisn. — wax grevillea (W.A.)
Grevillea insignis subsp. elliotii Olde & Marriott
Grevillea insignis Kippist ex Meisn. subsp. insignis
Grevillea integrifolia  (Endl.) Meisn. — entire-leaved grevillea (W.A.)
Grevillea intricata Meisn. (W.A.)
Grevillea involucrata A.S.George — Lake Varley grevillea (W.A.)
Grevillea irrasa Makinson (N.S.W.)
Grevillea irrasa subsp. didymochiton Makinson
Grevillea irrasa subsp. irrasa Makinson

J

Grevillea jephcottii J.H.Willis — Pine Mountain grevillea, green grevillea, Jephcott's grevillea (Vic.)
Grevillea johnsonii McGill. — Johnson's grevillea (N.S.W.)
Grevillea juncifolia Hook. – honeysuckle grevillea, honey grevillea (W.A., S.A., N.T., Qld., N.S.W.)
Grevillea juncifolia Hook. subsp. juncifolia
Grevillea juncifolia subsp. temulenta Olde & Marriott
Grevillea juniperina R.Br. — juniper grevillea (Qld., N.S.W.)
Grevillea juniperina subsp. allojohnsonii Makinson
Grevillea juniperina subsp. amphitricha Makinson
Grevillea juniperina subsp. fortis Makinson
Grevillea juniperina R.Br. subsp. juniperina 
Grevillea juniperina subsp. sulphurea (A.Cunn.) Makinson 
Grevillea juniperina subsp. trinervis (R.Br.) Makinson
Grevillea juniperina subsp. villosa Makinson

K

Grevillea kedumbensis (McGill.) Olde & Marriott (N.S.W.)
Grevillea kenneallyi McGill. (W.A.)
Grevillea kennedyana F.Muell. – flame spider flower (Qld., N.S.W.)
Grevillea kirkalocka Olde & Marriott (W.A.)

L

Grevillea lanigera A.Cunn. ex R.Br. — woolly grevillea (N.S.W., A.C.T., Vic.)
Grevillea latifolia C.A.Gardner (W.A.)
Grevillea laurifolia Sieber ex Spreng. (N.S.W.)
Grevillea laurifolia subsp. caleyana Olde 
Grevillea laurifolia Sieber ex Spreng. subsp. laurifolia
Grevillea lavandulacea  Schltdl. — lavender grevillea
Grevillea lavandulacea Schltdl. subsp. lavandulacea (S.A., Vic.)
Grevillea lavandulacea subsp. rogersii (Maiden) Makinson (S.A.)
Grevillea leiophylla F.Muell. ex Benth. – wallum grevillea, dwarf spider oak (Qld.)
Grevillea leptobotrys Meisn. – tangled grevillea (W.A.)
Grevillea leptopoda McGill. (W.A.)
Grevillea leucoclada McGill. (W.A.)
Grevillea leucopteris Meisn. — old socks, white plume grevillea (W.A.)
Grevillea levis Olde & Marriott (W.A.)
Grevillea linearifolia (Cav.) Druce – linear-leaf grevillea (N.S.W.)
Grevillea linsmithii McGill. (Qld., N.S.W.)
Grevillea lissopleura McGill. (W.A.)
Grevillea longicuspis McGill. (N.T.)
Grevillea longifolia R.Br. – fern-leaf grevillea (N.S.W.)
Grevillea longistyla Hook. (Qld.)
Grevillea lullfitzii McGill. (W.A.)

M

Grevillea maccutcheonii Keighery & Cranfield – McCutcheon's grevillea (W.A.)
Grevillea macleayana (McGill.) Olde & Marriott – Jervis Bay grevillea (N.S.W.)
Grevillea macmillanii Guillaumin (New Caledonia)
Grevillea maherae Makinson (W.A.)
Grevillea makinsonii McGill. (W.A.)
Grevillea manglesii (Graham) Planch. (W.A.)
Grevillea manglesii subsp. dissectifolia (McGill.) McGill.
Grevillea manglesii (Graham) Planch. subsp. manglesii
Grevillea manglesii subsp. ornithopoda (Meisn.) McGill. 
Grevillea manglesioides Meisn. (W.A.) 
Grevillea manglesioides subsp. ferricola Keighery 
Grevillea manglesioides Meisn. subsp. manglesioides
Grevillea manglesioides subsp. metaxa Makinson 
Grevillea marriottii Olde (W.A.)
Grevillea masonii Olde & Marriott Mason's grevillea (N.S.W.)
Grevillea maxwellii McGill. (W.A.)
Grevillea mcgillivrayi I.M.Turner (Qld.)
Grevillea meisneri Montrouz. (New Caledonia)
Grevillea meisneri Montrouz. var. meisneri
Grevillea meisneri var. rhododesmia (Schltr.) Virot
Grevillea metamorpha Makinson (W.A.)
Grevillea micrantha Meisn. — small-flower grevillea (Vic.)
Grevillea microstegia Molyneux — Mount Cassell grevillea (Vic.)
Grevillea microstyla M.D.Barrett & Makinson (W.A.)
Grevillea mimosoides R.Br. – caustic bush (W.A., N.T., Qld.)
Grevillea miniata W.Fitzg. – sandstone grevillea (W.A., N.T.)
Grevillea minutiflora McGill. (W.A.)
Grevillea miqueliana F.Muell. (Vic.)
Grevillea miqueliana subsp. cincta  Molyneux & Stajsic — Selma Saddle grevillea
Grevillea miqueliana F.Muell. subsp. miqueliana — oval-leaf grevillea
Grevillea miqueliana subsp. moroka Molyneux & Stajsic — Moroka grevillea
Grevillea mollis Olde & Molyneux – soft grevillea (N.S.W.)
Grevillea molyneuxii  McGill. – Wingello grevillea (N.S.W.)
Grevillea monslacana Molyneux & Stajsic — Lake Mountain grevillea (Vic.)
Grevillea montana R.Br. (N.S.W.)
Grevillea monticola Meisn. (W.A.)
Grevillea montis-cole R.V.Sm. – Mount Cole grevillea (Vic.)
Grevillea montis-cole subsp. brevistyla R.V.Sm. — Langi Ghiran grevillea
Grevillea montis-cole R.V.Sm. subsp. montis—cole — Mount Cole grevillea
Grevillea mucronulata R.Br. — green spider flower (N.S.W.)
Grevillea muelleri Benth. (W.A.)
Grevillea murex McGill. (W.A.)
Grevillea muricata J.M.Black (S.A.)
Grevillea myosodes McGill. (W.A.)

N

Grevillea nana C.A.Gardner – dwarf grevillea (W.A.)
Grevillea nana subsp. abbreviata McGill.
Grevillea nana C.A.Gardner subsp. nana
Grevillea nematophylla F.Muell. – water bush, silver-leaved water bush (W.A., S.A., N.T., N.S.W.)
Grevillea nematophylla F.Muell. subsp. nematophylla
Grevillea nematophylla subsp. planicosta Makinson
Grevillea nematophylla subsp. supraplana Makinson
Grevillea neodissecta I.M.Turner (W.A.)
Grevillea neorigida I.M.Turner (W.A.)
Grevillea neurophylla Gand. – granite grevillea (N.S.W., A.C.T., Vic.)
Grevillea neurophylla subsp. fluviatilis Makinson
Grevillea neurophylla Gand. subsp. neurophylla
Grevillea newbeyi McGill. (W.A.)
Grevillea nivea Olde & Marriott (W.A.)
Grevillea nudiflora Meisn. (W.A.)

O

Grevillea obliquistigma C.A.Gardner (W.A.)
Grevillea obliquistigma subsp. cullenii Olde & Marriott
Grevillea obliquistigma subsp. funicularis Olde & Marriott
Grevillea obliquistigma C.A.Gardner subsp. obliquistigma
Grevillea obtecta Molyneux — Fryerstown grevillea, Elphinstone grevillea, Taradale grevillea (Vic.)
Grevillea obtusiflora R.Br. (N.SW.)
Grevillea obtusiflora subsp. fecunda Makinson
Grevillea obtusiflora R.Br. subsp. obtusiflora 
Grevillea obtusifolia Meisn. — obtuse-leaved grevillea (W.A.)
Grevillea occidentalis R.Br. (W.A.)
Grevillea oldei McGill. (N.S.W.)
Grevillea oleoides Sieber ex Schult. & Schult.f. — red spider flower (N.S.W.)
Grevillea oligantha F.Muell. (W.A.)
Grevillea oligomera (McGill.) Olde & Marriott (W.A.)
Grevillea olivacea A.S.George — olive grevillea (W.A.)
Grevillea oncogyne Diels (W.A.)
Grevillea oxyantha Makinson (N.S.W., A.C.T.)
Grevillea oxyantha subsp. ecarinata Makinson
Grevillea oxyantha Makinson subsp. oxyantha

P

Grevillea pachylostyla (McGill.) Olde & Marriott — Buchan River grevillea (Vic.)
Grevillea paniculata Meisn. – kerosene bush (W.A.)
Grevillea papillosa (McGill.) Olde & Marriott (W.A.)
Grevillea papuana Diels (N.G.)
Grevillea paradoxa F.Muell. (W.A.)
Grevillea parallela Knight – silver oak, beefwood, white grevillea (W.A., N.T., Qld.)
Grevillea parallelinervis Carrick (S.A.)
Grevillea parviflora R.Br. – small-flower grevillea (N.S.W.)
Grevillea parvula Molyneux & Stajsic — Genoa grevillea (N.S.W., Vic.)
Grevillea patentiloba F.Muell. (W.A.)
Grevillea patentiloba F.Muell. subsp. patentiloba
Grevillea patentiloba subsp. platypoda (F.Muell.) Olde & Marriott
Grevillea patulifolia Gand. — swamp grevillea (N.S.W., Vic.)
Grevillea pauciflora R.Br. – few-flowered grevillea, Port Lincoln grevillea (S.A., W.A.)
Grevillea pauciflora subsp. leptophylla W.R.Barker
Grevillea pauciflora  R.Br. subsp. pauciflora
Grevillea pectinata  R.Br. — comb-leaf grevillea (W.A.)
Grevillea petrophiloides  Meisn. — pink pokers (W.A.)
Grevillea petrophiloides subsp. magnifica 
Grevillea petrophiloides Meisn. subsp. petrophiloides
Grevillea petrophiloides subsp. remota (Olde & Marriott) Makinson
Grevillea phanerophlebia Diels (W.A.)
Grevillea phillipsiana McGill. (W.A.)
Grevillea phylicoides R.Br. (N.S.W.)
Grevillea pieroniae* Olde 
Grevillea pilosa A.S.George (W.A.)
Grevillea pilosa A.S.George subsp. pilosa
Grevillea pilosa subsp. redacta Olde & Marriott
Grevillea pilulifera (Lindl.) Druce (W.A.)
Grevillea pimeleoides W.Fitzg. (W.A.)
Grevillea pinaster Meisn. (W.A.)
Grevillea pinifolia Meisn. (W.A.) 
Grevillea pityophylla F.Muell. (W.A.)
Grevillea pluricaulis (McGill.) Olde & Marriott (W.A.)
Grevillea plurijuga F.Muell. (W.A.)
Grevillea plurijuga F.Muell. subsp. plurijuga
Grevillea plurijuga subsp. superba (Olde & Marriott) Makinson
Grevillea polyacida McGill. (N.T.)
Grevillea polybotrya Meisn. (W.A.)
Grevillea polybractea H.B.Will. — crimson grevillea (N.S.W., Vic.)
Grevillea polychroma (Molyneux & Stajsic) Molyneux & Stajsic — Tullach Ard grevillea (Vic.)
Grevillea prasina McGill. (W.A., N.T.)
Grevillea preissii Meisn. (W.A.)
Grevillea preissii subsp.glabrilimba Olde & Marriott
Grevillea preissii Meisn. subsp. preissii 
Grevillea prominens Olde & Marriott (W.A.)
Grevillea prostrata C.A.Gardner & A.S.George (W.A.)
Grevillea psilantha McGill. (W.A.)
Grevillea pteridifolia Knight — silky grevillea, Darwin silky oak, ferny-leaved silky oak, fern-leaved grevillea, golden grevillea, golden tree, golden parrot tree (W.A., N.T., Qld.)
Grevillea pterosperma F.Muell. – desert grevillea, desert spider-flower (W.A., S.A., N.T., N.S.W., Vic.)
Grevillea pulchella (R.Br.) Meisn. — beautiful grevillea (W.A.)
Grevillea pulchella subsp. ascendens Olde & Marriott
Grevillea pulchella (R.Br.) Meisn. subsp. pulchella
Grevillea punctata Olde & Marriott (W.A.)
Grevillea pungens R.Br. – flame grevillea (N.T.)
Grevillea pyramidalis A.Cunn. ex R.Br. – caustic bush (N.T., W.A.)
Grevillea pyramidalis subsp. leucadendron (A.Cunn. ex R.Br.) Makinson 
Grevillea pyramidalis subsp. longiloba Olde & Marriott
Grevillea pyramidalis A.Cunn. ex R.Br. subsp. pyramidalis
Grevillea pythara Olde & Marriott (W.A.)

Q

Grevillea quadricauda Olde & Marriott (Qld., N.S.W.)
Grevillea quercifolia R.Br. (W.A.)
Grevillea quinquenervis J.M.Black (W.A.)

R

Grevillea ramosissima Meisn. (N.S.W., Vic.)
Grevillea ramosissima subsp. hypargyrea (F.Muell.) Olde & Marriott — fan grevillea (Vic.)
Grevillea ramosissima Meisn. subsp. ramosissima (N.S.W.)
Grevillea rara Olde & Marriott (W.A.)
Grevillea raybrownii Olde & Marriott (N.S.W.)
Grevillea refracta R.Br. – silver leaf grevillea (W.A., N.T., Qld.)
Grevillea refracta subsp. glandulifera Olde & Marriott (W.A., N.T.)
Grevillea refracta R.Br. subsp. refracta (W.A., N.T., Qld.)
Grevillea renwickiana F.Muell. (N.S.W.)
Grevillea repens F.Muell. ex Meisn. — creeping grevillea (Vic.)
Grevillea reptans Makinson – Tin Can Bay grevillea (Qld.)
Grevillea rhizomatosa Olde & Marriott (N.S.W.)
Grevillea rhyolitica Makinson — Deua grevillea, Deua flame (N.S.W.)
Grevillea rhyolitica Makinson subsp. rhyolitica
Grevillea rhyolitica subsp. semivestita Makinson
Grevillea ripicola A.S.George — Collie grevillea (W.A.)
Grevillea rivularis L.A.S.Johnson & McGill. — Carrington Falls grevillea (N.S.W.)
Grevillea robusta A.Cunn. ex R.Br. — silky oak (N.S.W., Qld.)
Grevillea rogersoniana C.A.Gardner – Rogerson's grevillea (W.A.)
Grevillea rosieri McGill. (W.A.)
Grevillea rosmarinifolia A.Cunn. — rosemary grevillea (N.S.W., Vic.)
Grevillea rosmarinifolia subsp. glabella (R.Br.) Makinson
Grevillea rosmarinifolia A.Cunn. subsp. rosmarinifolia
Grevillea roycei McGill. (W.A.)
Grevillea rubicunda S.Moore (N.T.)
Grevillea rubiginosa Brongn. & Gris (New Caledonia)
Grevillea rudis Meisn. (W.A.)

S

 
Grevillea saccata Benth. — pouched grevillea (W.A.)
Grevillea sarissa S.Moore — wheel grevillea (W.A., S.A.)
Grevillea sarissa subsp. anfractifolia McGill. (W.A.)
Grevillea sarissa subsp. bicolor McGill. (W.A.) 
Grevillea sarissa subsp. rectitepala McGill. (W.A.) 
Grevillea sarissa S.Moore subsp. sarissa (W.A.)
Grevillea sarissa subsp. succincta McGill. (W.A.)
Grevillea sarissa subsp. umbellifera (J.M.Black) McGill. (S.A.) 
Grevillea saxicola S.J.Dillon (W.A.)
Grevillea scabra Meisn. (W.A.)
Grevillea scabrida C.A.Gardner (W.A.) 
Grevillea scapigera A.S.George — Corrigin grevillea (W.A.)
Grevillea scortechinii (F.Muell. ex Scort.) F.Muell. (Qld., N.S.W.)
Grevillea scortechinii subsp. sarmentosa (Blakely & McKie) McGill.
Grevillea scortechinii (F.Muell. ex Scort.) F.Muell. subsp. scortechinii
Grevillea secunda  McGill. (W.A.)
Grevillea sericea (Sm.) R.Br. (N.S.W.)
Grevillea sericea subsp. riparia (R.Br.) Olde & Marriott
Grevillea sericea (Sm.) R.Br. subsp. sericea
Grevillea sessilis C.T.White & W.D.Francis (Qld.)
Grevillea shiressii Blakely (N.S.W.)
Grevillea shuttleworthiana Meisn. (W.A.)
Grevillea shuttleworthiana subsp. canarina Olde & Marriott
Grevillea shuttleworthiana subsp. obovata (Benth.) Olde & Marriott
Grevillea shuttleworthiana Meisn. subsp. shuttleworthiana 
Grevillea singuliflora F.Muell. (Qld.)
Grevillea sinuata Brongn. & Gris (New Caledonia)
Grevillea sp. Duranillin (E.F. Shedley 180)
Grevillea sp. Harrismith (G.J. Keighery & N. Gibson 7094) 
Grevilea sp. Ocean Reef (D. Pike Joon 4)
Grevillea sp. Throsby Trig (R.G.Coveny 19002 & A.E.Orme)
Grevillea sp. Toodyay West (F. Hort et al. 3296)        
Grevillea sparsiflora F.Muell. (W.A.)
Grevillea speciosa (Knight) McGill. — red spider-flower (N.S.W.)
Grevillea sphacelata R.Br. — grey spider-flower (N.S.W.)
Grevillea spinosa McGill. – spiny grevillea (W.A.)
Grevillea spinosissima McGill. (W.A.)
Grevillea squiresiae Olde & Marriott (W.A.)
Grevillea steiglitziana N.A.Wakef. — Brisbane Range grevillea (Vic.)
Grevillea stenobotrya F.Muell. — sandhill spider-flower, sandhill grevillea, rattle-pod grevillea (W.A., N.T., S.A., Qld., N.S.W.) 
Grevillea stenogyne (Benth.) Makinson (W.A.) 
Grevillea stenomera F.Muell. — lace-net grevillea (W.A.)
Grevillea stenostachya C.A.Gardner (W.A.)
Grevillea striata R.Br. — beefwood, western beefwood, beef oak, beef silky oak, silvery honeysuckle (W.A., N.T., S.A., Qld., N.S.W.)
Grevillea subterlineata Makinson (W.A.)
Grevillea subtiliflora McGill. (W.A.)
Grevillea sulcata C.A.Gardner ex Olde & Marriott (W.A.)
Grevillea synapheae R.Br. — catkin grevillea (W.A.) 
Grevillea synapheae subsp. Mt Misery (S.D.Hopper 6333) 
Grevillea synapheae subsp. latiloba (Meisn.) Makinson
Grevillea synapheae subsp. minyulo Makinson
Grevillea synapheae subsp. pachyphylla Olde & Marriott
Grevillea synapheae R.Br. subsp. synapheae

T

Grevillea tenuiflora (Lindl.) Meisn.
Grevillea tenuiloba C.A.Gardner
Grevillea teretifolia Meisn.
Grevillea tetragonoloba Meisn.
Grevillea tetrapleura McGill.
Grevillea thelemanniana Hugel ex Endl. — spider-net grevillea
Grevillea thyrsoides Meisn.
Grevillea thyrsoides subsp. pustulata Olde & Marriott 
Grevillea thyrsoides Meisn. subsp. thyrsoides
Grevillea trachytheca F.Muell. 
Grevillea treueriana F.Muell. — Mount Finke grevillea
Grevillea trifida (R.Br.) Meisn. 
Grevillea triloba Meisn.
Grevillea tripartita Meisn.
Grevillea tripartita subsp. macrostylis (F.Muell.) Makinson
Grevillea tripartita Meisn. subsp. tripartita
Grevillea triternata R.Br.

U

Grevillea umbellulata Meisn.
Grevillea uncinulata Diels
Grevillea uniformis (McGill.) Olde & Marriott

V

Grevillea variifolia C.A.Gardner & A.S.George
Grevillea variifolia subsp. bundera Keighery
Grevillea variifolia  C.A.Gardner & A.S.George subsp. variifolia
Grevillea velutinella McGill. 
Grevillea venusta R.Br. — Byfield Spider Flower
Grevillea versicolor McGill.
Grevillea vestita (Endl.) Meisn.    
Grevillea vestita subsp. isopogoides F.Muell. ex McGill.
Grevillea vestita (Endl.) Meisn. subsp. vestita 
Grevillea victoriae F.Muell. — royal grevillea
Grevillea victoriae subsp. brindabella Stajsic 
Grevillea victoriae subsp. nivalis Stajsic & Molyneux — Kosciuszko grevillea 
Grevillea victoriae F.Muell. subsp. victoriae — royal grevillea
Grevillea virgata Makinson
Grevillea viridiflava Makinson

W

Grevillea whiteana McGill. — Mundubbera grevillea
Grevillea wickhamii Meisn. — Wickham's grevillea, arajukaljukua, ijaka, lukkulburra
Grevillea wickhamii subsp. aprica McGill.
Grevillea wickhamii subsp. cratista Makinson
Grevillea wickhamii subsp. hispidula Makinson
Grevillea wickhamii subsp. macrodonta Makinson
Grevillea wickhamii subsp. pallida Makinson
Grevillea wickhamii Meisn. subsp. wickhamii
Grevillea wilkinsonii Makinson — Tumut grevillea
Grevillea williamsonii F.Muell.
Grevillea willisii R.V.Sm. & McGill. — Omeo grevillea, rock grevillea
Grevillea wilsonii A.Cunn. — Wilson's grevillea, native fuchsia
Grevillea wiradjuri Makinson
Grevillea wittweri McGill.

X
   
Grevillea xiphoidea Olde & Marriott

Y

Grevillea yorkrakinensis C.A.Gardner

Z
 
Grevillea zygoloba Olde & Marriott

Note:* Grevillea pieroniae described in 2020 and Grevillea hortiorum and Grevillea hystrix described in 2021 and are not yet accepted by the Australian Plant Census or by Plants of the World Online.

See also
:Category:Grevillea taxa by common name
List of Grevillea cultivars

References

Grevillea species
Grevillea